NaviFon is a free mobile navigation application, designed specifically for mobile devices, and has all the functions of the portable device. Works on all mobile platforms: Windows Mobile, iPhone, Java, Symbian S60 ed.3 and S60 ed.5., Android, BlackBerry, and Bada. It allows using a phone as a full GPS navigator. Since 2007, NaviFon has been installed by Samsung on phones at the factory. It is available for download in all popular applications stores: iTunes Store, GetJar, and Android Market.

Features 

 Cross-platform
 Find the addresses and objects on the map
 Service information on the cameras and traffic jams
 Pedestrian and Vehicle Routes
 Find points of interest
 View information on nearby objects
 Universal personal account on the site
 Find the coordinates
 The route to the intersection
 Weather on the ground
 Report on the route
 3D and night mode decoupling navigation
 Notification of a location by SMS

Reviews 
{{quote|...Practically NaviFon works on any modern mobile phone with support of JAVA platform.
A Bluetooth GPS receiver pinpoints your current position (longitude and latitude) and transmits this information via Bluetooth to your mobile phone (GPS-Bluetooth device is not required for mobile devices that already have internal “build in” GPS module).
By entering your destination (Street address, City, Category...) into the application

Instructional video
For added convenience, users of communication and a quick overview of the functions of the program, there are video instructions for use NaviFon. In these details the functions of the program, about how to contact the program on different phones. You can view a video on the channel NaviFon in Youtube

References

External links
 
 Blog
 Review(Rus)
 NaviFon vs OVI

Android (operating system) software